Pleuroloma cala is a species in the order Polydesmida ("flat-backed millipedes"), in the class Diplopoda ("millipedes").
Pleuroloma cala is found in North America.

References

Further reading
 Hoffman, Richard L. (1999). Checklist of the Millipeds of North and Middle America.

External links

Polydesmida